The Greeks or Hellenes (Éllines ) are an ethnic group and nation native to Greece, Cyprus, southern Albania, Anatolia, parts of Italy and Egypt, and to a lesser extent, other countries surrounding the Eastern Mediterranean and Black Sea. They also form a significant diaspora, with many Greek communities established around the world.

Greek colonies and communities have been historically established on the shores of the Mediterranean Sea and Black Sea, but the Greek people themselves have always been centered on the Aegean and Ionian seas, where the Greek language has been spoken since the Bronze Age. Until the early 20th century, Greeks were distributed between the Greek peninsula, the western coast of Asia Minor, the Black Sea coast, Cappadocia in central Anatolia, Egypt, the Balkans, Cyprus, and Constantinople. Many of these regions coincided to a large extent with the borders of the Byzantine Empire of the late 11th century and the Eastern Mediterranean areas of ancient Greek colonization. The cultural centers of the Greeks have included Athens, Thessalonica, Alexandria, Smyrna, and Constantinople at various periods.

In recent times, most ethnic Greeks live within the borders of the modern Greek state or in Cyprus. The Greek genocide and population exchange between Greece and Turkey nearly ended the three millennia-old Greek presence in Asia Minor. Other longstanding Greek populations can be found from southern Italy to the Caucasus and southern Russia and Ukraine and in the Greek diaspora communities in a number of other countries. Today, most Greeks are officially registered as members of the Greek Orthodox Church.

Greeks have greatly influenced and contributed to culture, visual arts, exploration, theatre, literature, philosophy, ethics, politics, architecture, music, mathematics, medicine, science, technology, commerce, cuisine and sports. The Greek language is the oldest written language still in use and its vocabulary has been the basis of many languages, including English as well as international scientific nomenclature. Greek was by far the most widely spoken lingua franca in the Mediterranean world  and the New Testament of the Christian Bible was also originally written in Greek.

History

The Greeks speak the Greek language, which forms its own unique branch within the Indo-European family of languages, the Hellenic. They are part of a group of classical ethnicities, described by Anthony D. Smith as an "archetypal diaspora people".

Origins

The Proto-Greeks probably arrived at the area now called Greece, in the southern tip of the Balkan peninsula, at the end of the 3rd millennium BC between 2200 and 1900 BC. The sequence of migrations into the Greek mainland during the 2nd millennium BC has to be reconstructed on the basis of the ancient Greek dialects, as they presented themselves centuries later and are therefore subject to some uncertainties. There were at least two migrations, the first being the Ionians and Achaeans, which resulted in Mycenaean Greece by the 16th century BC, and the second, the Dorian invasion, around the 11th century BC, displacing the Arcadocypriot dialects, which descended from the Mycenaean period. Both migrations occur at incisive periods, the Mycenaean at the transition to the Late Bronze Age and the Doric at the Bronze Age collapse.

Mycenaean

In  1600 BC, the Mycenaean Greeks borrowed from the Minoan civilization its syllabic writing system (Linear A) and developed their own syllabic script known as Linear B, providing the first and oldest written evidence of Greek. The Mycenaeans quickly penetrated the Aegean Sea and, by the 15th century BC, had reached Rhodes, Crete, Cyprus and the shores of Asia Minor.

Around 1200 BC, the Dorians, another Greek-speaking people, followed from Epirus. Older historical research often proposed Dorian invasion caused the collapse of the Mycenaean civilization, but this narrative has been abandoned in all contemporary research. It is likely that one of the factors which contributed to the Mycenaean palatial collapse was linked to raids by groups known in historiography as the "Sea Peoples" who sailed into the eastern Mediterranean around 1180 BC. The Dorian invasion was followed by a poorly attested period of migrations, appropriately called the Greek Dark Ages, but by 800 BC the landscape of Archaic and Classical Greece was discernible.

The Greeks of classical antiquity idealized their Mycenaean ancestors and the Mycenaean period as a glorious era of heroes, closeness of the gods and material wealth. The Homeric Epics (i.e. Iliad and Odyssey) were especially and generally accepted as part of the Greek past and it was not until the time of Euhemerism that scholars began to question Homer's historicity. As part of the Mycenaean heritage that survived, the names of the gods and goddesses of Mycenaean Greece (e.g. Zeus, Poseidon and Hades) became major figures of the Olympian Pantheon of later antiquity.

Classical

The ethnogenesis of the Greek nation is linked to the development of Pan-Hellenism in the 8th century BC. According to some scholars, the foundational event was the Olympic Games in 776 BC, when the idea of a common Hellenism among the Greek tribes was first translated into a shared cultural experience and Hellenism was primarily a matter of common culture. The works of Homer (i.e. Iliad and Odyssey) and Hesiod (i.e. Theogony) were written in the 8th century BC, becoming the basis of the national religion, ethos, history and mythology. The Oracle of Apollo at Delphi was established in this period.

The classical period of Greek civilization covers a time spanning from the early 5th century BC to the death of Alexander the Great, in 323 BC (some authors prefer to split this period into "Classical", from the end of the Greco-Persian Wars to the end of the Peloponnesian War, and "Fourth Century", up to the death of Alexander). It is so named because it set the standards by which Greek civilization would be judged in later eras. The Classical period is also described as the "Golden Age" of Greek civilization, and its art, philosophy, architecture and literature would be instrumental in the formation and development of Western culture.

While the Greeks of the classical era understood themselves to belong to a common Hellenic genos, their first loyalty was to their city and they saw nothing incongruous about warring, often brutally, with other Greek city-states. The Peloponnesian War, the large scale civil war between the two most powerful Greek city-states Athens and Sparta and their allies, left both greatly weakened.

Most of the feuding Greek city-states were, in some scholars' opinions, united by force under the banner of Philip's and Alexander the Great's Pan-Hellenic ideals, though others might generally opt, rather, for an explanation of "Macedonian conquest for the sake of conquest" or at least conquest for the sake of riches, glory and power and view the "ideal" as useful propaganda directed towards the city-states.

In any case, Alexander's toppling of the Achaemenid Empire, after his victories at the battles of the Granicus, Issus and Gaugamela, and his advance as far as modern-day Pakistan and Tajikistan, provided an important outlet for Greek culture, via the creation of colonies and trade routes along the way. While the Alexandrian empire did not survive its creator's death intact, the cultural implications of the spread of Hellenism across much of the Middle East and Asia were to prove long lived as Greek became the lingua franca, a position it retained even in Roman times. Many Greeks settled in Hellenistic cities like Alexandria, Antioch and Seleucia.

Hellenistic

The Hellenistic civilization was the next period of Greek civilization, the beginnings of which are usually placed at Alexander's death. This Hellenistic age, so called because it saw the partial Hellenization of many non-Greek cultures, extending all the way into India and Bactria, both of which maintained Greek cultures and governments for centuries. The end is often placed around conquest of Egypt by Rome in 30 BC, although the Indo-Greek kingdoms lasted for a few more decades.

This age saw the Greeks move towards larger cities and a reduction in the importance of the city-state. These larger cities were parts of the still larger Kingdoms of the Diadochi. Greeks, however, remained aware of their past, chiefly through the study of the works of Homer and the classical authors. An important factor in maintaining Greek identity was contact with barbarian (non-Greek) peoples, which was deepened in the new cosmopolitan environment of the multi-ethnic Hellenistic kingdoms. This led to a strong desire among Greeks to organize the transmission of the Hellenic paideia to the next generation. Greek science, technology and mathematics are generally considered to have reached their peak during the Hellenistic period.

In the Indo-Greek and Greco-Bactrian kingdoms, Greco-Buddhism was spreading and Greek missionaries would play an important role in propagating it to China. Further east, the Greeks of Alexandria Eschate became known to the Chinese people as the Dayuan.

Roman Empire

Between 168 BC and 30 BC, the entire Greek world was conquered by Rome, and almost all of the world's Greek speakers lived as citizens or subjects of the Roman Empire. Despite their military superiority, the Romans admired and became heavily influenced by the achievements of Greek culture, hence Horace's famous statement: Graecia capta ferum victorem cepit ("Greece, although captured, took its wild conqueror captive"). In the centuries following the Roman conquest of the Greek world, the Greek and Roman cultures merged into a single Greco-Roman culture.

In the religious sphere, this was a period of profound change. The spiritual revolution that took place, saw a waning of the old Greek religion, whose decline beginning in the 3rd century BC continued with the introduction of new religious movements from the East. The cults of deities like Isis and Mithra were introduced into the Greek world. Greek-speaking communities of the Hellenized East were instrumental in the spread of early Christianity in the 2nd and 3rd centuries, and Christianity's early leaders and writers (notably Saint Paul) were generally Greek-speaking, though none were from Greece proper. However, Greece itself had a tendency to cling to paganism and was not one of the influential centers of early Christianity: in fact, some ancient Greek religious practices remained in vogue until the end of the 4th century, with some areas such as the southeastern Peloponnese remaining pagan until well into the mid-Byzantine 10th century AD. The region of Tsakonia remained pagan until the ninth century and as such its inhabitants were referred to as Hellenes, in the sense of being pagan, by their Christianized Greek brethren in mainstream Byzantine society.

While ethnic distinctions still existed in the Roman Empire, they became secondary to religious considerations, and the renewed empire used Christianity as a tool to support its cohesion and promote a robust Roman national identity. From the early centuries of the Common Era, the Greeks self-identified as Romans (Greek:  Rhōmaîoi). By that time, the name Hellenes denoted pagans but was revived as an ethnonym in the 11th century.

Middle Ages

During most of the Middle Ages, the Byzantine Greeks self-identified as Rhōmaîoi ("Romans", meaning citizens of the Roman Empire), a term which in the Greek language had become synonymous with Christian Greeks. The Latinizing term Graikoí (Γραικοί, "Greeks") was also used, though its use was less common, and nonexistent in official Byzantine political correspondence, prior to the Fourth Crusade of 1204. The Eastern Roman Empire (today conventionally named the Byzantine Empire, a name not used during its own time) became increasingly influenced by Greek culture after the 7th century when Emperor Heraclius ( 610–641 AD) decided to make Greek the empire's official language. Although the Catholic Church recognized the Eastern Empire's claim to the Roman legacy for several centuries, after Pope Leo III crowned Charlemagne, king of the Franks, as the "Roman Emperor" on 25 December 800, an act which eventually led to the formation of the Holy Roman Empire, the Latin West started to favour the Franks and began to refer to the Eastern Roman Empire largely as the Empire of the Greeks (Imperium Graecorum). While this Latin term for the ancient Hellenes could be used neutrally, its use by Westerners from the 9th century onwards in order to challenge Byzantine claims to ancient Roman heritage rendered it a derogatory exonym for the Byzantines who barely used it, mostly in contexts relating to the West, such as texts relating to the Council of Florence, to present the Western viewpoint. Additionally, among the Germanic and the Slavic peoples, the Rhōmaîoi were just called Greeks. 

There are three schools of thought regarding this Byzantine Roman identity in contemporary Byzantine scholarship: The first considers "Romanity" the mode of self-identification of the subjects of a multi-ethnic empire at least up to the 12th century, where the average subject identified as Roman; a perennialist approach, which views Romanity as the medieval expression of a continuously existing Greek nation; while a third view considers the eastern Roman identity as a pre-modern national identity. The Byzantine Greeks' essential values were drawn from both Christianity and the Homeric tradition of ancient Greece.

A distinct Greek identity re-emerged in the 11th century in educated circles and became more forceful after the fall of Constantinople to the Crusaders of the Fourth Crusade in 1204. In the Empire of Nicaea, a small circle of the elite used the term "Hellene" as a term of self-identification. For example, in a letter to Pope Gregory IX, the Nicaean emperor John III Doukas Vatatzes (r. 1221–1254) claimed to have received the gift of royalty from Constantine the Great, and put emphasis on his "Hellenic" descent, exalting the wisdom of the Greek people. After the Byzantines recaptured Constantinople, however, in 1261, Rhomaioi became again dominant as a term for self-description and there are few traces of Hellene (Έλληνας), such as in the writings of George Gemistos Plethon, who abandoned Christianity and in whose writings culminated the secular tendency in the interest in the classical past. However, it was the combination of Orthodox Christianity with a specifically Greek identity that shaped the Greeks' notion of themselves in the empire's twilight years. In the twilight years of the Byzantine Empire, prominent Byzantine personalities proposed referring to the Byzantine Emperor as the "Emperor of the Hellenes". These largely rhetorical expressions of Hellenic identity were confined within intellectual circles, but were continued by Byzantine intellectuals who participated in the Italian Renaissance.

The interest in the Classical Greek heritage was complemented by a renewed emphasis on Greek Orthodox identity, which was reinforced in the late Medieval and Ottoman Greeks' links with their fellow Orthodox Christians in the Russian Empire. These were further strengthened following the fall of the Empire of Trebizond in 1461, after which and until the second Russo-Turkish War of 1828–29 hundreds of thousands of Pontic Greeks fled or migrated from the Pontic Alps and Armenian Highlands to southern Russia and the Russian South Caucasus (see also Greeks in Russia, Greeks in Armenia, Greeks in Georgia, and Caucasian Greeks).

These Byzantine Greeks were largely responsible for the preservation of the literature of the classical era. Byzantine grammarians were those principally responsible for carrying, in person and in writing, ancient Greek grammatical and literary studies to the West during the 15th century, giving the Italian Renaissance a major boost. The Aristotelian philosophical tradition was nearly unbroken in the Greek world for almost two thousand years, until the Fall of Constantinople in 1453.

To the Slavic world, the Byzantine Greeks contributed by the dissemination of literacy and Christianity. The most notable example of the later was the work of the two Byzantine Greek brothers, the monks Saints Cyril and Methodius from the port city of Thessalonica, capital of the theme of Thessalonica, who are credited today with formalizing the first Slavic alphabet.

Ottoman Empire

Following the Fall of Constantinople on 29 May 1453, many Greeks sought better employment and education opportunities by leaving for the West, particularly Italy, Central Europe, Germany and Russia. Greeks are greatly credited for the European cultural revolution, later called, the Renaissance. In Greek-inhabited territory itself, Greeks came to play a leading role in the Ottoman Empire, due in part to the fact that the central hub of the empire, politically, culturally, and socially, was based on Western Thrace and Greek Macedonia, both in Northern Greece, and of course was centred on the mainly Greek-populated, former Byzantine capital, Constantinople. As a direct consequence of this situation, Greek-speakers came to play a hugely important role in the Ottoman trading and diplomatic establishment, as well as in the church. Added to this, in the first half of the Ottoman period men of Greek origin made up a significant proportion of the Ottoman army, navy, and state bureaucracy, having been levied as adolescents (along with especially Albanians and Serbs) into Ottoman service through the devshirme. Many Ottomans of Greek (or Albanian or Serb) origin were therefore to be found within the Ottoman forces which governed the provinces, from Ottoman Egypt, to Ottomans occupied Yemen and Algeria, frequently as provincial governors.

For those that remained under the Ottoman Empire's millet system, religion was the defining characteristic of national groups (milletler), so the exonym "Greeks" (Rumlar from the name Rhomaioi) was applied by the Ottomans to all members of the Orthodox Church, regardless of their language or ethnic origin. The Greek speakers were the only ethnic group to actually call themselves Romioi, (as opposed to being so named by others) and, at least those educated, considered their ethnicity (genos) to be Hellenic. There were, however, many Greeks who escaped the second-class status of Christians inherent in the Ottoman millet system, according to which Muslims were explicitly awarded senior status and preferential treatment. These Greeks either emigrated, particularly to their fellow Orthodox Christian protector, the Russian Empire, or simply converted to Islam, often only very superficially and whilst remaining crypto-Christian. The most notable examples of large-scale conversion to Turkish Islam among those today defined as Greek Muslims—excluding those who had to convert as a matter of course on being recruited through the devshirme—were to be found in Crete (Cretan Turks), Greek Macedonia (for example among the Vallahades of western Macedonia), and among Pontic Greeks in the Pontic Alps and Armenian Highlands. Several Ottoman sultans and princes were also of part Greek origin, with mothers who were either Greek concubines or princesses from Byzantine noble families, one famous example being sultan Selim the Grim ( 1517–1520), whose mother Gülbahar Hatun was a Pontic Greek.

The roots of Greek success in the Ottoman Empire can be traced to the Greek tradition of education and commerce exemplified in the Phanariotes. It was the wealth of the extensive merchant class that provided the material basis for the intellectual revival that was the prominent feature of Greek life in the half century and more leading to the outbreak of the Greek War of Independence in 1821. Not coincidentally, on the eve of 1821, the three most important centres of Greek learning were situated in Chios, Smyrna and Aivali, all three major centres of Greek commerce. Greek success was also favoured by Greek domination in the leadership of the Eastern Orthodox church.

Modern

The movement of the Greek enlightenment, the Greek expression of the Age of Enlightenment, contributed not only in the promotion of education, culture and printing among the Greeks, but also in the case of independence from the Ottomans, and the restoration of the term "Hellene". Adamantios Korais, probably the most important intellectual of the movement, advocated the use of the term "Hellene" (Έλληνας) or "Graikos" (Γραικός) in the place of Romiós, that was seen negatively by him.

The relationship between ethnic Greek identity and Greek Orthodox religion continued after the creation of the modern Greek nation-state in 1830. According to the second article of the first Greek constitution of 1822, a Greek was defined as any native Christian resident of the Kingdom of Greece, a clause removed by 1840. A century later, when the Treaty of Lausanne was signed between Greece and Turkey in 1923, the two countries agreed to use religion as the determinant for ethnic identity for the purposes of population exchange, although most of the Greeks displaced (over a million of the total 1.5 million) had already been driven out by the time the agreement was signed. The Greek genocide, in particular the harsh removal of Pontian Greeks from the southern shore area of the Black Sea, contemporaneous with and following the failed Greek Asia Minor Campaign, was part of this process of Turkification of the Ottoman Empire and the placement of its economy and trade, then largely in Greek hands under ethnic Turkish control.

Identity

The terms used to define Greekness have varied throughout history but were never limited or completely identified with membership to a Greek state. Herodotus gave a famous account of what defined Greek (Hellenic) ethnic identity in his day, enumerating 
shared descent (ὅμαιμον – homaimon, "of the same blood"),
shared language (ὁμόγλωσσον – homoglōsson, "speaking the same language")
shared sanctuaries and sacrifices (θεῶν ἱδρύματά τε κοινὰ καὶ θυσίαι – theōn hidrumata te koina kai thusiai) 
shared customs (ἤθεα ὁμότροπα – ēthea homotropa, "customs of like fashion").

By Western standards, the term Greeks has traditionally referred to any native speakers of the Greek language, whether Mycenaean, Byzantine or modern Greek. Byzantine Greeks self-identified as Romaioi ("Romans"), Graikoi ("Greeks") and Christianoi ("Christians") since they were the political heirs of imperial Rome, the descendants of their classical Greek forebears and followers of the Apostles; during the mid-to-late Byzantine period (11th–13th century), a growing number of Byzantine Greek intellectuals deemed themselves Hellenes although for most Greek-speakers, "Hellene" still meant pagan. On the eve of the Fall of Constantinople the Last Emperor urged his soldiers to remember that they were the descendants of Greeks and Romans.

Before the establishment of the modern Greek nation-state, the link between ancient and modern Greeks was emphasized by the scholars of Greek Enlightenment especially by Rigas Feraios. In his "Political Constitution", he addresses to the nation as "the people descendant of the Greeks". The modern Greek state was created in 1829, when the Greeks liberated a part of their historic homelands, Peloponnese, from the Ottoman Empire. The large Greek diaspora and merchant class were instrumental in transmitting the ideas of western romantic nationalism and philhellenism, which together with the conception of Hellenism, formulated during the last centuries of the Byzantine Empire, formed the basis of the Diafotismos and the current conception of Hellenism.

The Greeks today are a nation in the meaning of an ethnos, defined by possessing Greek culture and having a Greek mother tongue, not by citizenship, race, and religion or by being subjects of any particular state. In ancient and medieval times and to some extent today the Greek term was genos, which also indicates a common ancestry.

Names

Greeks and Greek-speakers have used different names to refer to themselves collectively. The term  (Ἀχαιοί) is one of the collective names for the Greeks in Homer's Iliad and Odyssey (the Homeric "long-haired Achaeans" would have been a part of the Mycenaean civilization that dominated Greece from  1600 BC until 1100 BC). In the historical period, Herodotus identified the Achaeans of the northern Peloponnese as descendants of the earlier, Homeric Achaeans.

Homer refers to the "Hellenes" as a relatively small tribe settled in Thessalic Phthia, with its warriors under the command of Achilleus. The Parian Chronicle says that Phthia was the homeland of the Hellenes and that this name was given to those previously called Greeks. In Greek mythology, Hellen, the patriarch of the Hellenes who ruled around Phthia, was the son of Pyrrha and Deucalion, the only survivors after the Great Deluge. The Greek philosopher Aristotle names ancient Hellas as an area in Epirus between Dodona and the Achelous river, the location of the Great Deluge of Deucalion, a land occupied by the Selloi and the "Greeks" who later came to be known as "Hellenes". In the Homeric tradition, the Selloi were the priests of Dodonian Zeus.

In the Hesiodic Catalogue of Women, Graecus is presented as the son of Zeus and Pandora II, sister of Hellen the patriarch of the Hellenes. Aristotle notes in his Meteorologica that the Hellenes were related to the Graikoi.

Continuity

The most obvious link between modern and ancient Greeks is their language, which has a documented tradition from at least the 14th century BC to the present day, albeit with a break during the Greek Dark Ages from which written records are absent (11th- 8th cent. BC, though the Cypriot syllabary was in use during this period). Scholars compare its continuity of tradition to Chinese alone. Since its inception, Hellenism was primarily a matter of common culture and the national continuity of the Greek world is a lot more certain than its demographic. Yet, Hellenism also embodied an ancestral dimension through aspects of Athenian literature that developed and influenced ideas of descent based on autochthony. During the later years of the Eastern Roman Empire, areas such as Ionia and Constantinople experienced a Hellenic revival in language, philosophy, and literature and on classical models of thought and scholarship. This revival provided a powerful impetus to the sense of cultural affinity with ancient Greece and its classical heritage. Throughout their history, the Greeks have retained their language and alphabet, certain values and cultural traditions, customs, a sense of religious and cultural difference and exclusion (the word barbarian was used by 12th-century historian Anna Komnene to describe non-Greek speakers), a sense of Greek identity and common sense of ethnicity despite the undeniable socio-political changes of the past two millennia. In recent anthropological studies, both ancient and modern Greek osteological samples were analyzed demonstrating a bio-genetic affinity and continuity shared between both groups. There is also a direct genetic link between ancient Greeks and modern Greeks.

Demographics

Today, Greeks are the majority ethnic group in the Hellenic Republic, where they constitute 93% of the country's population, and the Republic of Cyprus where they make up 78% of the island's population (excluding Turkish settlers in the occupied part of the country). Greek populations have not traditionally exhibited high rates of growth; a large percentage of Greek population growth since Greece's foundation in 1832 was attributed to annexation of new territories, as well as the influx of 1.5 million Greek refugees after the 1923 population exchange between Greece and Turkey. About 80% of the population of Greece is urban, with 28% concentrated in the city of Athens.

Greeks from Cyprus have a similar history of emigration, usually to the English-speaking world because of the island's colonization by the British Empire. Waves of emigration followed the Turkish invasion of Cyprus in 1974, while the population decreased between mid-1974 and 1977 as a result of emigration, war losses, and a temporary decline in fertility. After the ethnic cleansing of a third of the Greek population of the island in 1974, there was also an increase in the number of Greek Cypriots leaving, especially for the Middle East, which contributed to a decrease in population that tapered off in the 1990s. Today more than two-thirds of the Greek population in Cyprus is urban.

Around 1990, most Western estimates of the number of ethnic Greeks in Albania were around 200,000 but in the 1990s, a majority of them migrated to Greece. The Greek minority of Turkey, which numbered upwards of 200,000 people after the 1923 exchange, has now dwindled to a few thousand, after the 1955 Constantinople Pogrom and other state sponsored violence and discrimination. This effectively ended, though not entirely, the three-thousand-year-old presence of Hellenism in Asia Minor. There are smaller Greek minorities in the rest of the Balkan countries, the Levant and the Black Sea states, remnants of the Old Greek Diaspora (pre-19th century).

Diaspora

The total number of Greeks living outside Greece and Cyprus today is a contentious issue. Where census figures are available, they show around 3 million Greeks outside Greece and Cyprus. Estimates provided by the SAE - World Council of Hellenes Abroad put the figure at around 7 million worldwide. According to George Prevelakis of Sorbonne University, the number is closer to just below 5 million. Integration, intermarriage, and loss of the Greek language, influence the self-identification of the Greek diaspora (Omogenia); important centres include New York, Melbourne, London and Toronto. In 2010, the Hellenic Parliament introduced a law that allowed members of the diaspora to vote in the Greek elections; this law was later repealed in early 2014.

The American Hellenic Council's Census 2020 Initiative encourages the Greek American diaspora to identify as Greek when asked about their ethnic origins. Identifying as Greek in the US Census will result in funds being invested to support services in the Greek American community, including funding for Greek education, including Greek language programs and services for government-run programs, as well as funding to support Medicare, aged care, Section 8 housing, and many other services.

Ancient

In ancient times, the trading and colonizing activities of the Greek tribes and city states spread the Greek culture, religion and language around the Mediterranean and Black Sea basins, especially in Sicily and southern Italy (also known as Magna Grecia), Spain, the south of France and the Black sea coasts. Under Alexander the Great's empire and successor states, Greek and Hellenizing ruling classes were established in the Middle East, India and in Egypt. The Hellenistic period is characterized by a new wave of Greek colonization that established Greek cities and kingdoms in Asia and Africa. Under the Roman Empire, easier movement of people spread Greeks across the Empire and in the eastern territories, Greek became the lingua franca rather than Latin. The modern-day Griko community of southern Italy, numbering about 60,000, may represent a living remnant of the ancient Greek populations of Italy.

Modern

During and after the Greek War of Independence, Greeks of the diaspora were important in establishing the fledgling state, raising funds and awareness abroad. Greek merchant families already had contacts in other countries and during the disturbances many set up home around the Mediterranean (notably Marseilles in France, Livorno in Italy, Alexandria in Egypt), Russia (Odesa and Saint Petersburg), and Britain (London and Liverpool) from where they traded, typically in textiles and grain. Businesses frequently comprised the extended family, and with them they brought schools teaching Greek and the Greek Orthodox Church.

As markets changed and they became more established, some families grew their operations to become shippers, financed through the local Greek community, notably with the aid of the Ralli or Vagliano Brothers. With economic success, the Diaspora expanded further across the Levant, North Africa, India and the USA.

In the 20th century, many Greeks left their traditional homelands for economic reasons resulting in large migrations from Greece and Cyprus to the United States, Great Britain, Australia, Canada, Germany, and South Africa, especially after the Second World War (1939–1945), the Greek Civil War (1946–1949), and the Turkish Invasion of Cyprus in 1974.

While official figures remain scarce, polls and anecdotal evidence point to renewed Greek emigration as a result of the Greek financial crisis. According to data published by the Federal Statistical Office of Germany in 2011, 23,800 Greeks emigrated to Germany, a significant increase over the previous year. By comparison, about 9,000 Greeks emigrated to Germany in 2009 and 12,000 in 2010.

Culture

Greek culture has evolved over thousands of years, with its beginning in the Mycenaean civilization, continuing through the classical era, the Hellenistic period, the Roman and Byzantine periods and was profoundly affected by Christianity, which it in turn influenced and shaped. Ottoman Greeks had to endure through several centuries of adversity that culminated in genocide in the 20th century. The Diafotismos is credited with revitalizing Greek culture and giving birth to the synthesis of ancient and medieval elements that characterize it today.

Language

Most Greeks speak the Greek language, an independent branch of the Indo-European languages, with its closest relations possibly being Armenian (see Graeco-Armenian) or the Indo-Iranian languages (see Graeco-Aryan). It has the longest documented history of any living language and Greek literature has a continuous history of over 2,500 years. The oldest inscriptions in Greek are in the Linear B script, dated as far back as 1450 BC. Following the Greek Dark Ages, from which written records are absent, the Greek alphabet appears in the 9th–8th century BC. The Greek alphabet derived from the Phoenician alphabet, and in turn became the parent alphabet of the Latin, Cyrillic, and several other alphabets. The earliest Greek literary works are the Homeric epics, variously dated from the 8th to the 6th century BC. Notable scientific and mathematical works include Euclid's Elements, Ptolemy's Almagest, and others. The New Testament was originally written in Koine Greek.

Greek demonstrates several linguistic features that are shared with other Balkan languages, such as Albanian, Bulgarian and Eastern Romance languages (see Balkan sprachbund), and has absorbed many foreign words, primarily of Western European and Turkish origin. Because of the movements of Philhellenism and the Diafotismos in the 19th century, which emphasized the modern Greeks' ancient heritage, these foreign influences were excluded from official use via the creation of Katharevousa, a somewhat artificial form of Greek purged of all foreign influence and words, as the official language of the Greek state. In 1976, however, the Hellenic Parliament voted to make the spoken Dimotiki the official language, making Katharevousa obsolete.

Modern Greek has, in addition to Standard Modern Greek or Dimotiki, a wide variety of dialects of varying levels of mutual intelligibility, including Cypriot, Pontic, Cappadocian, Griko and Tsakonian (the only surviving representative of ancient Doric Greek). Yevanic is the language of the Romaniotes, and survives in small communities in Greece, New York and Israel. In addition to Greek, many Greek citizens in Greece and the diaspora are bilingual in other languages such as English, Arvanitika/Albanian, Aromanian, Megleno-Romanian, Macedonian Slavic, Russian and Turkish.

Religion

Most Greeks are Christians, belonging to the Greek Orthodox Church. During the first centuries after Jesus Christ, the New Testament was originally written in Koine Greek, which remains the liturgical language of the Greek Orthodox Church, and most of the early Christians and Church Fathers were Greek-speaking. There are small groups of ethnic Greeks adhering to other Christian denominations like Greek Catholics, Greek Evangelicals, Pentecostals, and groups adhering to other religions including Romaniot and Sephardic Jews and Greek Muslims. About 2,000 Greeks are members of Hellenic Polytheistic Reconstructionism congregations.

Greek-speaking Muslims live mainly outside Greece in the contemporary era. There are both Christian and Muslim Greek-speaking communities in Lebanon and Syria, while in the Pontus region of Turkey there is a large community of indeterminate size who were spared from the population exchange because of their religious affiliation.

Arts

Greek art has a long and varied history. Greeks have contributed to the visual, literary and performing arts. In the West, classical Greek art was influential in shaping the Roman and later the modern Western artistic heritage. Following the Renaissance in Europe, the humanist aesthetic and the high technical standards of Greek art inspired generations of European artists. Well into the 19th century, the classical tradition derived from Greece played an important role in the art of the Western world. In the East, Alexander the Great's conquests initiated several centuries of exchange between Greek, Central Asian and Indian cultures, resulting in Indo-Greek and Greco-Buddhist art, whose influence reached as far as Japan.

Byzantine Greek art, which grew from the Hellenistic classical art and adapted the pagan motifs in the service of Christianity, provided a stimulus to the art of many nations. Its influences can be traced from Venice in the West to Kazakhstan in the East. In turn, Greek art was influenced by eastern civilizations (i.e. Egypt, Persia, etc.) during various periods of its history.

Notable modern Greek artists include the major Renaissance painter Dominikos Theotokopoulos (El Greco), Nikolaos Gyzis, Nikiphoros Lytras, Konstantinos Volanakis, Theodoros Vryzakis, Georgios Jakobides, Thalia Flora-Karavia, Yannis Tsarouchis, Nikos Engonopoulos, Périclès Pantazis, Theophilos, Kostas Andreou, Jannis Kounellis, sculptors such as Leonidas Drosis, Georgios Bonanos, Yannoulis Chalepas, Athanasios Apartis, Konstantinos Dimitriadis and Joannis Avramidis, conductor Dimitri Mitropoulos, soprano Maria Callas, composers such as Mikis Theodorakis, Nikos Skalkottas, Nikolaos Mantzaros, Spyridon Samaras, Manolis Kalomiris, Iannis Xenakis, Manos Hatzidakis, Manos Loïzos, Yanni and Vangelis, the masters of rebetiko Markos Vamvakaris and Vassilis Tsitsanis, and singers such as Giorgos Dalaras, Haris Alexiou, Sotiria Bellou, Nana Mouskouri, Vicky Leandros and Demis Roussos. Poets such as Andreas Kalvos, Athanasios Christopoulos, Kostis Palamas, the writer of Hymn to Liberty Dionysios Solomos, Angelos Sikelianos, Kostas Karyotakis, Maria Polydouri, Yannis Ritsos, Kostas Varnalis, Nikos Kavvadias, Andreas Embirikos and Kiki Dimoula. Constantine P. Cavafy and Nobel laureates Giorgos Seferis and Odysseas Elytis are among the most important poets of the 20th century. Novel is also represented by Alexandros Papadiamantis, Emmanuel Rhoides, Ion Dragoumis, Nikos Kazantzakis, Penelope Delta, Stratis Myrivilis, Vassilis Vassilikos and Petros Markaris, while notable playwrights include the Cretan Renaissance poets Georgios Chortatzis and Vincenzos Cornaros, such as Gregorios Xenopoulos and Iakovos Kambanellis.

Notable cinema or theatre actors include Marika Kotopouli, Melina Mercouri, Ellie Lambeti, Academy Award winner Katina Paxinou, Alexis Minotis, Dimitris Horn, Thanasis Veggos, Manos Katrakis and Irene Papas. Alekos Sakellarios, Karolos Koun, Vasilis Georgiadis, Kostas Gavras, Michael Cacoyannis, Giannis Dalianidis, Nikos Koundouros and Theo Angelopoulos are among the most important directors.

Among the most significant modern-era architects are Stamatios Kleanthis, Lysandros Kaftanzoglou, Anastasios Metaxas, Panagis Kalkos, Anastasios Orlandos, the naturalized Greek Ernst Ziller, Dimitris Pikionis and urban planners Stamatis Voulgaris and George Candilis.

Science

The Greeks of the Classical and Hellenistic eras made seminal contributions to science and philosophy, laying the foundations of several western scientific traditions, such as astronomy, geography, historiography, mathematics, medicine, philosophy and political science. The scholarly tradition of the Greek academies was maintained during Roman times with several academic institutions in Constantinople, Antioch, Alexandria and other centers of Greek learning, while Byzantine science was essentially a continuation of classical science. Greeks have a long tradition of valuing and investing in paideia (education). Paideia was one of the highest societal values in the Greek and Hellenistic world while the first European institution described as a university was founded in 5th century Constantinople and operated in various incarnations until the city's fall to the Ottomans in 1453. The University of Constantinople was Christian Europe's first secular institution of higher learning since no theological subjects were taught, and considering the original meaning of the world university as a corporation of students, the world's first university as well.

As of 2007, Greece had the eighth highest percentage of tertiary enrollment in the world (with the percentages for female students being higher than for male) while Greeks of the Diaspora are equally active in the field of education. Hundreds of thousands of Greek students attend western universities every year while the faculty lists of leading Western universities contain a striking number of Greek names. Notable Greek scientists of modern times include: physician Georgios Papanicolaou (pioneer in cytopathology, inventor of the Pap test); mathematician Constantin Carathéodory (acclaimed contributor to real and complex analysis and the calculus of variations); archaeologists Manolis Andronikos (unearthed the tomb of Philip II), Valerios Stais (recognised the Antikythera mechanism), Spyridon Marinatos (specialised in Mycenaean sites) and Ioannis Svoronos; chemists Leonidas Zervas (of Bergmann-Zervas synthesis and Z-group discovery fame), K. C. Nicolaou (first total synthesis of taxol) and Panayotis Katsoyannis (first chemical synthesis of insulin); computer scientists Michael Dertouzos and Nicholas Negroponte (known for their early work with the World Wide Web), John Argyris (co-creator of the FEM), Joseph Sifakis (2007 Turing Award), Christos Papadimitriou (2002 Knuth Prize) and Mihalis Yannakakis (2005 Knuth Prize); physicist-mathematician Demetrios Christodoulou (renowned for work on Minkowski spacetime) and physicists Achilles Papapetrou (known for solutions of general relativity), Dimitri Nanopoulos (extensive work on particle physics and cosmology), and John Iliopoulos (2007 Dirac Prize for work on the charm quark); astronomer Eugenios Antoniadis; biologist Fotis Kafatos (contributor to cDNA cloning technology); botanist Theodoros Orphanides; economist Xenophon Zolotas (held various senior posts in international organisations such as the IMF); Indologist Dimitrios Galanos; linguist Yiannis Psycharis (promoter of Demotic Greek); historians Constantine Paparrigopoulos (founder of modern Greek historiography) and Helene Glykatzi Ahrweiler (excelled in Byzantine studies); and political scientists Nicos Poulantzas (a leading Structural Marxist) and Cornelius Castoriadis (philosopher of history and ontologist, social critic, economist, psychoanalyst).

Significant engineers and automobile designers include Nikolas Tombazis, Alec Issigonis and Andreas Zapatinas.

Symbols

The most widely used symbol is the flag of Greece, which features nine equal horizontal stripes of blue alternating with white representing the nine syllables of the Greek national motto Eleftheria i Thanatos (Freedom or Death), which was the motto of the Greek War of Independence. The blue square in the upper hoist-side corner bears a white cross, which represents Greek Orthodoxy. The Greek flag is widely used by the Greek Cypriots, although Cyprus has officially adopted a neutral flag to ease ethnic tensions with the Turkish Cypriot minority (see flag of Cyprus).

The pre-1978 (and first) flag of Greece, which features a Greek cross (crux immissa quadrata) on a blue background, is widely used as an alternative to the official flag, and they are often flown together. The national emblem of Greece features a blue escutcheon with a white cross surrounded by two laurel branches. A common design involves the current flag of Greece and the pre-1978 flag of Greece with crossed flagpoles and the national emblem placed in front.

Another highly recognizable and popular Greek symbol is the double-headed eagle, the imperial emblem of the last dynasty of the Eastern Roman Empire and a common symbol in Asia Minor and, later, Eastern Europe. It is not part of the modern Greek flag or coat-of-arms, although it is officially the insignia of the Greek Army and the flag of the Church of Greece. It had been incorporated in the Greek coat of arms between 1925 and 1926.

Politics

Classical Athens is considered the birthplace of Democracy. The term appeared in the 5th century BC to denote the political systems then existing in Greek city-states, notably Athens, to mean "rule of the people", in contrast to aristocracy, meaning "rule by an excellent elite", and to oligarchy. While theoretically these definitions are in opposition, in practice the distinction has been blurred historically. Led by Cleisthenes, Athenians established what is generally held as the first democracy in 508–507 BC, which took gradually the form of a direct democracy. The democratic form of government declined during the Hellenistic and Roman eras, only to be revived as an interest in Western Europe during the early modern period.

The European enlightenment and the democratic, liberal and nationalistic ideas of the French Revolution was a crucial factor to the outbreak of the Greek War of Independence and the establishment of the modern Greek state.

Notable modern Greek politicians include Ioannis Kapodistrias, founder of the First Hellenic Republic, reformist Charilaos Trikoupis, Eleftherios Venizelos, who marked the shape of modern Greece, social democrats Georgios Papandreou and Alexandros Papanastasiou, Konstantinos Karamanlis, founder of the Third Hellenic Republic, and socialist Andreas Papandreou.

Surnames and personal names

Greek surnames began to appear in the 9th and 10th century, at first among ruling families, eventually supplanting the ancient tradition of using the father's name as disambiguator. Nevertheless, Greek surnames are most commonly patronymics, such those ending in the suffix -opoulos or -ides, while others derive from trade professions, physical characteristics, or a location such as a town, village, or monastery. Commonly, Greek male surnames end in -s, which is the common ending for Greek masculine proper nouns in the nominative case. Occasionally (especially in Cyprus), some surnames end in -ou, indicating the genitive case of a patronymic name. Many surnames end in suffixes that are associated with a particular region, such as -akis (Crete), -eas or -akos (Mani Peninsula), -atos (island of Cephalonia), -ellis (island of Lesbos) and so forth. In addition to a Greek origin, some surnames have Turkish or Latin/Italian origin, especially among Greeks from Asia Minor and the Ionian Islands, respectively. Female surnames end in a vowel and are usually the genitive form of the corresponding males surname, although this usage is not followed in the diaspora, where the male version of the surname is generally used.

With respect to personal names, the two main influences are Christianity and classical Hellenism; ancient Greek nomenclatures were never forgotten but have become more widely bestowed from the 18th century onwards. As in antiquity, children are customarily named after their grandparents, with the first born male child named after the paternal grandfather, the second male child after the maternal grandfather, and similarly for female children. Personal names are often familiarized by a diminutive suffix, such as -akis for male names and -itsa or -oula for female names. Greeks generally do not use middle names, instead using the genitive of the father's first name as a middle name. This usage has been passed on to the Russians and other East Slavs (otchestvo).

Sea: exploring and commerce

The traditional Greek homelands have been the Greek peninsula and the Aegean Sea, Southern Italy (Magna Graecia), the Black Sea, the Ionian coasts of Asia Minor and the islands of Cyprus and Sicily. In Plato's Phaidon, Socrates remarks, "we (Greeks) live around a sea like frogs around a pond" when describing to his friends the Greek cities of the Aegean. This image is attested by the map of the Old Greek Diaspora, which corresponded to the Greek world until the creation of the Greek state in 1832. The sea and trade were natural outlets for Greeks since the Greek peninsula is mostly rocky and does not offer good prospects for agriculture.

Notable Greek seafarers include people such as Pytheas of Massalia who sailed to Great Britain, Euthymenes who sailed to Africa, Scylax of Caryanda who sailed to India, the navarch of Alexander the Great Nearchus, Megasthenes, explorer of India, later the 6th century merchant and monk Cosmas Indicopleustes (Cosmas who sailed to India), and the explorer of the Northwestern Passage Ioannis Fokas also known as Juan de Fuca. In later times, the Byzantine Greeks plied the sea-lanes of the Mediterranean and controlled trade until an embargo imposed by the Byzantine emperor on trade with the Caliphate opened the door for the later Italian pre-eminence in trade. Panayotis Potagos was another explorer of modern times who was the first to reach Mbomu and Uele River from the north.

The Greek shipping tradition recovered during the late Ottoman rule (especially after the Treaty of Küçük Kaynarca and during the Napoleonic Wars), when a substantial merchant middle class developed, which played an important part in the Greek War of Independence. Today, Greek shipping continues to prosper to the extent that Greece has one of the largest merchant fleets in the world, while many more ships under Greek ownership fly flags of convenience. The most notable shipping magnate of the 20th century was Aristotle Onassis, others being Yiannis Latsis, Stavros G. Livanos, and Stavros Niarchos.

Genetics

In their archaeogenetic study, Lazaridis et al. (2017) found that Minoans and Mycenaean Greeks were genetically highly similar, but not identical; modern Greeks resembled the Mycenaeans, but with some additional dilution of the early Neolithic ancestry. Furthermore, proposed migrations by Egyptian or Phoenician colonists was not discernible in their data, thus "rejecting the hypothesis that the cultures of the Aegean were seeded by migrants from the old civilizations of these regions." The F between the sampled Bronze Age populations and present-day West Eurasians was estimated, finding that Mycenaean Greeks and Minoans were least differentiated from the populations of modern Greece, Cyprus, Albania, and Italy. In a subsequent study, Lazaridis et al. (2022) concluded that around ~58.4–65.8% of the ancestry of the Mycenaeans came from Anatolian Neolithic Farmers (ANF), while the remainder mainly came from ancient populations related to the Caucasus Hunter-Gatherers (CHG) (~20.1–22.7%) and the Pre-Pottery Neolithic (PPN) culture in the Levant (~7–14%). The Mycenaeans had also inherited ~3.3–5.5% ancestry from a source related to the Eastern European Hunter-Gatherers (EHG), introduced via a proximal source related to the inhabitants of the Eurasian steppe who are hypothesized to be the Proto-Indo-Europeans, and ~0.9–2.3% from the Iron Gates Hunter-Gatherers in the Balkans. Mycenaean elites were genetically the same as Mycenaean commoners in terms of their steppe ancestry, while some Mycenaeans lacked it altogether.

A genetic study by Clemente et al. (2021) found that in the Early Bronze Age, the populations of the Minoan, Helladic, and Cycladic civilizations in the Aegean, were genetically homogeneous. In contrast, the Aegean population during the Middle Bronze Age was more differentiated; probably due to gene flow from a Yamnaya-related population from the Pontic–Caspian steppe. This is corroborated by sequenced genomes of Middle Bronze Age individuals from northern Greece, who had a much higher proportion of steppe-related ancestry; the timing of this gene flow was estimated at ∼2,300 BCE, and is consistent with the dominant linguistic theories explaining the emergence of the Proto-Greek language. Present-day Greeks share ∼90% of their ancestry with them, suggesting continuity between the two time periods. In the case of Mycenaean Greeks however, this steppe-related ancestry was diluted. The ancestry of the Mycenaeans could be explained via a 2-way admixture model of such MBA individuals in northern Greece, and either an EBA Aegean or MBA Minoan population; the difference between the two time periods could be explained by the general decline of the Mycenaean civilization.

Genetic studies using multiple autosomal, Y-DNA, and mtDNA markers, show that Greeks share similar backgrounds as the rest of the Europeans and especially Southern Europeans (Italians and southern Balkan populations such as Albanians, Slavic Macedonians and Romanians). A study in 2008 showed that Greeks are genetically closest to Italians and Romanians and another 2008 study showed that they are close to Italians, Albanians, Romanians and southern Balkan Slavs. A 2003 study showed that Greeks cluster with other South European (mainly Italians) and North-European populations and are close to the Basques, and F distances showed that they group with other European and Mediterranean populations, especially with Italians (−0.0001) and Tuscans (0.0005). A study in 2008 showed that Greek regional samples from the mainland cluster with those from the Balkans, principally Albanians while Cretan Greeks cluster with the central Mediterranean and Eastern Mediterranean samples. Studies using mitochondrial DNA gene markers (mtDNA) showed that Greeks group with other Mediterranean European populations and principal component analysis (PCA) confirmed the low genetic distance between Greeks and Italians and also revealed a cline of genes with highest frequencies in the Balkans and Southern Italy, spreading to lowest levels in Britain and the Basque country, which Cavalli-Sforza associates it with "the Greek expansion, which reached its peak in historical times around 1000 and 500 BC but which certainly began earlier".

Physical appearance

A study from 2013 for prediction of hair and eye colour from DNA of the Greek people showed that the self-reported phenotype frequencies according to hair and eye colour categories was as follows: 119 individuals – hair colour, 11 blond, 45 dark blond/light brown, 49 dark brown, 3 brown red/auburn and 11 had black hair; eye colour, 13 with blue, 15 with intermediate (green, heterochromia) and 91 had brown eye colour.

Another study from 2012 included 150 dental school students from the University of Athens, and the results of the study showed that light hair colour (blonde/light ash brown) was predominant in 10.7% of the students. 36% had medium hair colour (light brown/medium darkest brown), 32% had darkest brown and 21% black (15.3 off black, 6% midnight black). In conclusion, the hair colour of young Greeks are mostly brown, ranging from light to dark brown with significant minorities having black and blonde hair. The same study also showed that the eye colour of the students was 14.6% blue/green, 28% medium (light brown) and 57.4% dark brown.

Timeline
The history of the Greek people is closely associated with the history of Greece, Cyprus, Southern Italy, Constantinople, Asia Minor and the Black Sea. During the Ottoman rule of Greece, a number of Greek enclaves around the Mediterranean were cut off from the core, notably in Southern Italy, the Caucasus, Syria and Egypt. By the early 20th century, over half of the overall Greek-speaking population was settled in Asia Minor (now Turkey), while later that century a huge wave of migration to the United States, Australia, Canada and elsewhere created the modern Greek diaspora.

See also

Antiochian Greeks
Arvanites
Cappadocian Greeks
Caucasian Greeks
Greek Cypriots
Greek Diaspora
Griko people
Karamanlides
Macedonians (Greeks)
Maniots
Greek Muslims
Northern Epirotes
Pelasgians
Pontic Greeks
Romaniotes
Sarakatsani
Tsakones
Lists
List of ancient Greeks
List of Greeks
List of Greek Americans

Notes

Citations

References

Further reading

Mycenaean Greeks

Classical Greeks

Hellenistic Greeks

Byzantine Greeks

Ottoman Greeks

Modern Greeks

External links

Diaspora
World Council of Hellenes Abroad (SAE), Umbrella Diaspora Organization

Religious
Ecumenical Patriarchate of Constantinople
Greek Orthodox Patriarchate of Alexandria
Greek Orthodox Patriarchate of Antioch
Greek Orthodox Patriarchate of Jerusalem 
Church of Cyprus
Church of Greece

Academic
Transnational Communities Programme at the University of Oxford , includes papers on the Greek Diaspora
Greeks on Greekness: The Construction and Uses of the Greek Past among Greeks under the Roman Empire.
The Modern Greek Studies Association is a scholarly organization for modern Greek studies in North America, which publishes the Journal of Modern Greek Studies.
Got Greek? Next Generation National Research Study
Waterloo Institute for Hellenistic Studies

Trade organizations
Hellenic Canadian Board of Trade
Hellenic Canadian Lawyers Association
Hellenic Canadian Congress of British Columbia
Hellenic-American Chamber of Commerce
Hellenic-Argentine Chamber of Industry and Commerce (C.I.C.H.A.)

Charitable organizations
AHEPA – American Hellenic Educational Progressive Association
Hellenic Heritage Foundation
Hellenic Home for the Aged
Hellenic Hope Center
Hellenic Scholarships

Ethnic groups in Greece
 
Ancient peoples of Europe
Indo-European peoples
Modern Indo-European peoples